Topper is a sportswear brand established in Argentina and currently owned by Brazilian "BRS Comercio e Industria de Material Esportivo SA", headquartered in São Paulo. The brand is commercialised in South America, mainly in Brazil, Uruguay and Argentina, where it markets a wide range of products from footwear to clothing.

Topper was established in 1975 in Argentina as the sports brand of Alpargatas to compete against foreign sneakers manufacturers. In past years, products manufactured and commercialised under the Topper brand included football, basketball, rugby, tennis, and volleyball equipment.

History 
Topper was founded in Argentina in 1975 by Alpargatas, the leading textile manufacturer in the country that had been established in 1885. The name "Topper" came from the dog of then president of the company, Eduardo Oxenford.  During its first decade of existence, Topper launched its canvas shoe, a model of casual footwear which would soon reached not only a huge success but also became the most representative product of the firm in Argentina, and being considered a real "classic" since then.

During the 1980s Topper became one of the most important sportswear brands of Argentina, signing deals with clubs such as Independiente, Ferro Carril Oeste and Estudiantes de La Plata. Most of those teams won several championships (not only in football but in basketball) during that era.

In recent years, Topper supplied garments for the basketball and volleyball national teams. The company also signed new contracts with former teams Independiente and Estudiantes and made new agreements with football teams Racing and Newell's Old Boys and rugby union clubs San Isidro and Hindú.

The brand was also the official supplier for the Argentina national rugby union team (known as Los Pumas) from 2000 to 2003.

In 2007 Alpargatas Argentina was sold to São Paulo Alpargatas (owner of Topper in Brazil), then a Camargo Correa group company.

In 2012 Topper brought a lawsuit against club Estudiantes de La Plata for $13 million. The brand accused Estudiantes of "breach of contract" due to the club had switched to German company Adidas in 2011, while the deal with Topper was still active. Adidas and Estudiantes had signed for US$3 million for 3 years. Topper alleged that there was a clause stating that Estudiantes was forced to continue being sponsored by Topper if other brands offered the same amount of money to be their uniform supplier.

In 2018, Alpargatas Brazil sold the brand Topper to "BRS Comercio e Industria de Material Esportivo SA" for a total of R$ 40 million. BRS is a holding company composed by a group of investors led by Carlos Wizard Martins. The contract signed included the license for the use of the brand "Topper" in the US and China.

Products 
The following chart contains all the product lines by Topper in Argentina and Brazil.

Past sponsorships 
Topper has sponsored a large list of teams and associations mainly in South America, some of them are:

Association Football

Associations

  Série B
  Série C
  Série D
  Copa Nordeste
  FERJ
  FGF

National teams
  (1981–93)

Club teams

  Arsenal de Sarandí (1980–85)
  Belgrano (C) (1983–92)
  Chacarita Juniors (1980–84)
  Independiente (1981–86, 1997–2004)
  Ferro Carril Oeste (1979–96)
  Estudiantes LP (1982–88, 2006–11)
  Gimnasia y Esgrima LP (1982–84)
  Lanús (1981–87, 1993–98)
  Newell's Old Boys (2006–14) 
  Platense (1981–84)
  Racing (1995–97, 2001–05, 2014–16)
  Rosario Central (1983–92) 
  San Lorenzo (1992–93)
  Atlético Mineiro (2010–12, 2017–18)
  Brasil de Pelotas (2016–19)
  Botafogo (1999–2001, 2016–19)
  Ceará (2016–19)
  Corinthians (1980–89, 1999–2002)
  Cruzeiro (1984–85, 1998–2005)
  Figueirense (2018 – 19)
  Goiás (2017–18)
  Guaraní (2017–20)
  Grêmio (2011–14)
  Íbis (2020–21)
  Internacional (2000–05)
  Náutico (2016–19)
  Paraná (2016–19)
  Ponte Preta (2018–20)
  Remo (2016–19)
  São Paulo (2003–05)
  Vitória (2017–19)

Players

  Darío Conca
  Marcio Amoroso
  Alex Meschini
  Diego Souza
  Marcos Silveira
  Marcelo Lomba

Bastketball

National teams 
  (1979–1997, 2002–06)

Club teams 

  Botafogo 
  Atenas 
  Ferro Carril Oeste (1979–1997)
  Peñarol (1991–2000)
  Gimnasia y Esgrima LP (1980–1984)

Rugby Union

Associations
  Brazil (2010-2021)

National Teams

  (2000–03)
  (2010-2021)

Club teams

  C.A. San Isidro
  Hindú

Tennis

Associations
  Minas Tênis Clube

Players

  David Nalbandian
  Diego Schwartzman
  Guillermo Vilas
  José Acasuso
  Juan Ignacio Chela
  Martín Vassallo Argüello
  Davis Cup national team
  Facundo Argüello
  Fernando Meligeni
  Caio Zampieri

References

External links

 

Sporting goods manufacturers of Argentina
Sporting goods manufacturers of Brazil
Athletic shoe brands
Sportswear brands
Argentine brands
Brazilian brands
Clothing companies established in 1975
1975 establishments in Argentina